Peter de Sève is an American artist who has worked in the illustration and animation fields. He has drawn many covers for the magazine The New Yorker. As a character designer, he worked on the characters of A Bug's Life, Finding Nemo, Robots, the Ice Age franchise, and on the main animal character E.B. (voiced by Russell Brand) in the 2011 Easter themed comedy film Hop. Most recently, he designed the characters for Arthur Christmas, for which he was nominated for Annie Award. He received the National Cartoonists Society Magazine Illustration Award for 2000. He is also a recipient of the Hamilton King Award from the Society of Illustrators, a Clio Award for a Nike television commercial, and a Visual Effects Society Award nomination for outstanding animated character design for Ice Age: Dawn of the Dinosaurs. Peter was honored with an Emmy Award for Outstanding Character design for his work on Sesame Street's Abby Cadabby's Flying Fairy School. He is part of the Directors Collective Hornet Incorporated company.

Work

Character designer
 The Hunchback of Notre Dame (1996)
 The Prince of Egypt (1998)
 Mulan (1998)
 A Bug's Life (1998)
 Tarzan (1999)
 Ice Age (2002)
 Treasure Planet (2002)
 Finding Nemo (2003)
 Robots (2005)
 Ice Age: The Meltdown (2006)
 Space Chimps (2008)
 Ice Age: Dawn of the Dinosaurs (2009)
 Hop (2011)
 Arthur Christmas (2011)
 Ice Age: Continental Drift (2012)
 The Little Prince (2015)
 Ice Age: Collision Course (2016)
 Rock Dog (2016)
 Sing (2016) (uncredited)
 Despicable Me 3 (2017) (uncredited)
 The Ice Age Adventures of Buck Wild (2022)

Visual development artist
 The Emperor's New Groove (2000)
 Monsters, Inc. (2001)
 Treasure Planet (2002)
 Ratatouille (2007)
 Epic (2013)
 Zootopia (2016) (uncredited)
 Ferdinand (2017)

Other
 Lilo & Stitch (2002) (additional production support)

References

External links

Peter de Sève's website
Peter de Sève's blog

1958 births
Living people
American illustrators
Artists from New York City
The New Yorker people
Parsons School of Design alumni
People from Queens, New York
Illumination (company) people
Blue Sky Studios people
Pixar people
Walt Disney Animation Studios people